Ferrazzi is an Italian surname. Notable people with the surname include:

Bill Ferrazzi (1907–1993), American baseball player
Cecilia Ferrazzi (1609–1684), Counter-Reformation Catholic mystic
Ferruccio Ferrazzi (1891–1978), Italian painter and sculptor
Keith Ferrazzi, American writer
Pierpaolo Ferrazzi (born 1965), Italian slalom canoeist

See also
Ferrazza

Italian-language surnames